Zaw Zaw Aung (born 1971) is a Burmese artist.

Zaw Zaw Aung was born at Danubyu, Irrawaddy Division, Burma, in 1971. He graduated from Yangon State School of Fine Arts in 1990. He has participated in many local and overseas shows and his works have been collected by the National Museum of Singapore, Jenidong Park Medical Centre, Brunei, Simon & Helena Arts Services, Singapore, Strand Hotel of Yangon, Myanmar and Art Asia NYC, New York. He was co-author of Art Standards with Kin Maung Yin.

Museum Collections
 Singapore Art Museum

References

External links
 Official website

1971 births
Living people
People from Ayeyarwady Region
Burmese painters
Burmese artists
Burmese writers